{{Infobox person
| image = 
| caption = 
| birth_date = 
| birth_place = Harlem, New York, U.S.
| occupation = Actor
| known_for = Kenny ("Bud") –The Cosby ShowJordan Bennett – Sister, SisterDarren Dixon – Getting By
| years_active = 1986–Present
| children = 
}}
Deon Richmond (born April 2, 1978) is an American actor from New York City who is best known for his recurring roles as Rudy Huxtable's friend Kenny (nicknamed "Bud") on the NBC sitcom The Cosby Show and Jordan Bennett on the ABC/The WB sitcom Sister, Sister.Career
Richmond's earliest roles include an appearance in the music video for the 1985 Kool & the Gang song "Cherish". In 1986, Richmond made his debut as Kenny on The Cosby Show. He made his first appearance in the episode "Theo's Flight", and would go on to appear in 32 episodes of the show until it ended in 1992. In 1987, Richmond played a young Eddie Murphy in the beginning scenes of the film Eddie Murphy Raw, and also appeared in the film Enemy Territory as Chet. Richmond appeared in the Kris Kross music video "Warm It Up" in 1992. He played Darren Dixon in the 1993–94 sitcom Getting By with Merlin Santana as his brother Marcus, they were cast as brothers due to their interaction on The Cosby Show. In 1997, Richmond began his role as Tamera Campbell's boyfriend Jordan Bennett on the fifth season of the hit series Sister, Sister, and became a regular cast member during its sixth and final season. In later years, Richmond appeared in films such as Trippin', Scream 3, Not Another Teen Movie, National Lampoon's Van Wilder, and the independent horror film Hatchet. He also had a featured role in the short-lived 2006 sitcom Teachers''.

Filmography

Film

Television

References

External links

1978 births
Living people
20th-century African-American people
20th-century American male actors
21st-century African-American people
21st-century American male actors
African-American male actors
American male child actors
American male film actors
American male television actors
Male actors from New York (state)
Male actors from New York City
People from Harlem